Capel Baines (10 June 1908 – 18 August 1999) was a South African cricketer. He played in two first-class matches for Border in 1929/30.

See also
 List of Border representative cricketers

References

External links
 

1908 births
1999 deaths
South African cricketers
Border cricketers
People from Somerset East
Cricketers from the Eastern Cape